The CityEl is a 3-wheel lightweight electric car originally designed and manufactured in Denmark, but currently made in Germany by Citycom GmbH.

History
The CityEl was originally developed as the Mini-El by Danish company El Trans A/S in Randers and was first brought onto the market by them in 1987. After El Trans A/S had to give up production in 1988 and two subsequent manufacturers (Eltrans89 A/S in 1993 and CityCom A/S in 1995),  one more try was done with Citycom Electromoblie Denmark A/S, before a German investor took over and moved the company to Aub. In 2009 the company was renamed Smiles AG, when it started to sell electric vehicles of other brands besides their own; but three years later Smiles experienced financial difficulties and production of the CityEl restarted with CityCom GmbH.

The vehicle is for one person, seated centrally.  Rather than conventional doors, the whole top-half of the vehicle hinges upwards on gas-struts allowing access to the cockpit. An optional child seat allows the car to carry a child (up to 30 kg), sitting behind the front seat on the engine compartment, facing backwards.  The driver operates car-like controls (steering wheel, brake and throttle pedals) although the vehicle is classed as an electric motorcycle in some countries.

There have been three body styles since production started. The 'Basic' version has a completely solid roof. Some versions have plexiglass side-windows.  The Convertible was a fully open version no-longer made by CityCom. In its place the 'Targa' version was constructed, with a removable centre soft top but solid rear windows. In America the City El was sold with a different roof, made out of fibreglass. This roof is slightly different from the factory-built City El roof.

Technical specifications 
The consumption from Series2 and up was 7 to 9 kW·h/100 km. The new version FactFour has four lead acid batteries, a much better 4 kW electric motor that provides a  top speed and  range. The consumption is 3.5 to 5 kW·h/100 km. The City El is regularly modified by enthusiasts and it is common to see City Els powered by alternative batteries, such as the nickel-cadmium battery or a different lithium-ion battery. The improved performance and range given to the City El by using such batteries make them a viable town commuting vehicle with enough acceleration to keep up with city traffic. 
 

A City El weighs , and the front end can be lifted quite easily. When the batteries are removed it is possible for three people to lift a City El off the ground. When a City El is retrofitted with 100 Ah Thunder-sky lithium-ion batteries, the car becomes approximately  lighter, bringing the weight of the City El well under that of some motorbikes.

 the City El features a 4.5 kW motor powered by a 48 V lithium iron phosphate battery capable of storing from 60–100 Ah, i.e. up to 4.8 kWh.

See also
Cyclecar
List of motorized trikes

References

 Hans-Ulrich von Mende, Matthias Dietz & Benedikt Taschen (Sep 1994), Kleinwagen, Small Cars, Petites Voitures, Taschen.  
 Coverage on CityEl in the TV show "Das! mobil", July 27, 2005, on German TV channel NDR Fernsehen 
 Coverage in German magazine Solarmobil, issues 55/56, 57, and 59. ISSN 0941-102X

External links
 German homepage of the producer
 French homepage of the importer 
 Danish homepage of the importer
 Service/Dealer homepage (German)
 Service/Dealer Homepage (Danish)
 CityEl and FactFour
 British City El driver who uses her City El as daily transport
 Battery Vehicle Society with active City El forum
 German forum for City El owners and its wiki
 Yahoo English Language group for City El and Mini El owners
 Elektromobil, German language site for CityEL and other electric vehicles
 EcoCarForum, includes forum for eco-friendly cars including the CityEL
 Ellert.info, Danish site, with much information about the CityEL and Mini-el]

Electric three-wheel vehicles
Electric cars
Car manufacturers of Denmark
Car manufacturers of Germany